Foluke Adenike Adeboye (née Adeyokunnu; born 13 July 1948) also known as Mummy G.O. is a pastor, televangelist, conference speaker, author and wife of Enoch Adeboye, the general overseer of the Redeemed Christian Church of God.

Early life
Foluke Adeboye was born Foluke Adenike Adeyokunnu on 13 July 1948 to the family of Jacob Adelusi Adeyokunnu, a prince of the royal family of Owa Obokun Oji in Ijeshaland, Osun State, Nigeria. Not only was her father of royal lineage but also a teacher in the Methodist mission and a catechist. She is the eldest of six daughters and four sons born to that family.

Education
She attended Methodist Primary School-Oke Eshe- Ilesha and Methodist Girls School- Agurodo-Ilesha before obtaining a grade II teacher's certificate from United Missionary College, Ibadan, and a diploma in education (science and mathematics) at the College of Education, University of Lagos.

On 17 July 2022, she got a doctorate degree in Education from the Benson Idahosa University, Benin, Edo State.

References

Living people
1948 births
People from Osun State
Yoruba Christian clergy